The 1989–90 Copa México was the 62nd staging of the Copa México, the 35th staging in the professional era.

The competition started on January 17, 1990, and concluded on April 18, 1990, with the final, held at the Estadio Cuauhtémoc in Puebla City, in which Puebla lifted the trophy for the fourth time ever with a 4–3 victory over Tigres UANL.

For this edition the teams were seeded 1–20 based on points at the end of the round 19 in the 1989–90 league:

Preliminary round

Knock-out rounds

Semifinals

First leg

Second leg

Puebla F.C. go to the final 2–1 on aggregate

Puebla F.C. go to the final 2–1 on aggregate on away goals

Finals

First leg

Second leg

Puebla won the Cup 4-3 on aggregate

References
Mexico - Statistics of Copa México in season 1989/1990. (RSSSF)

Copa MX
Cop
1989–90 domestic association football cups